Saint-Julien-du-Puy (Languedocien: Sant Julian dal Puòg) is a commune in the Tarn department and Occitanie region of southern France.

Geography
The commune is traversed by the river Dadou.

See also
Communes of the Tarn department

References

Communes of Tarn (department)